Trevor Carrodus (born 29 November 1952) is a former  Australian rules footballer who played with South Melbourne in the Victorian Football League (VFL).

Notes

External links 

Living people
1952 births
Australian rules footballers from New South Wales
Sydney Swans players